The Imperial Service Infantry Brigade was an infantry brigade of the British Indian Army that saw active service in the East African Campaign in the First World War.

History
The Imperial Service Infantry Brigade was formed in August 1914, mostly from Imperial Service Troops (forces raised by the princely states of the British Indian Empire), hence its name.  It was assigned to Indian Expeditionary Force B along with 27th (Bangalore) Brigade.  The Force sailed from Bombay (Mumbai) on 16 October with Tanga in German East Africa as the target for an attack.  After the failure of the Battle of Tanga (2–5 November), the Force disembarked at Mombasa and joined the defences of British East Africa.  The brigade was broken up at this point.

Order of battle
The brigade had the following composition in the First World War:
 13th Rajputs (The Shekhawati Regiment)
 2nd Battalion, Kashmir Rifles (I.S.)
 half of 3rd Battalion, Kashmir Rifles (I.S.)
 half of 3rd Battalion, Gwalior Infantry (I.S.)

Commander
The brigade was commanded from formation by Brigadier-General Michael Tighe.  He later commanded the 2nd East African Division.

See also

 Imperial Service Cavalry Brigade

Notes

References

Bibliography

External links

Military units and formations of the princely states of India
Brigades of India in World War I
Military units and formations established in 1914
Military units and formations disestablished in 1914